Rajmund Tomasz Andrzejczak (born 29 December 1967) is a Polish general, serving as Chief of the General Staff of the Polish Armed Forces since 2 July 2018.

Life

Education
He is a graduate of the Military Academy of the Armored Forces in Poznań (1991), the Defense Academy of the Czech Army in Brno, the National Defence University of Warsaw, and the Royal College of Defense Studies.

Military career 
Promotions

 Podporucznik (1991)
 Lieutenant (1994)
 Captain (1995)
 Major (2000)
 Lieutenant Colonel (2004)
 Colonel (2008)
 Brigadier General (2011)
 Divisional General (2016)
 General of the Branch (2018)
 General (2019)

Andrzejczak began his military carrier as a platoon commander (2nd Infantry Regiment located in the city of Giżycko). Between 1993 and 1996 he served as a commander of a tank company within the 15th Mechanised Brigade. From 1996 till 1998 he served in 4th Armoured Cavalry Brigade. He also served as chief of staff (1998–1999) and as deputy commander (2001–2003) of the Lithuanian-Polish Peace Force Battalion (LITPOLBAT).

In the years 2003–2005 Andrzejczak was appointed to a command position within the 15th Mechanised Brigade (as commander of the 1st armoured battalion). His next position was deputy chief  the G-3 Operations Branch of the Land Forces Command. During the next four years he took part in missions in Iraq and Afghanistan. Shortly after his return from foreign missions he was appointed as the deputy commander of the 34th Armoured Cavalry Brigade in Żagań (2008–2010). Subsequently, he was moved to Cracow to 2nd Mechanised Corps, where he took the position of an assistant to the chief of staff (2010–2012). 
In 2011 he was promoted to brigadier general. Next year he took the position of commander of the 17th Mechanised Brigade in Międzyrzecz. In 2016 he became the commander of 12th Mechanised Division. On the same year Andrzejczak was promoted to major general. On 2 July 2018, Andrzej Duda appointed him to the post of the chief of the general staff and promoted him to lieutenant general.

On 12 November 2019, Andrzejczak received nomination to the rank of general. On 25 June 2021 Polish President appointed him for second term as Chief of staff of the Polish Armed Forces.

Gallery

References

External links 
 Biography of Rajmund Andrzejczak on the website of the Ministry of National Defence of the Republic of Poland.

Polish generals
1967 births
Living people
People from Świdnica
Graduates of the Royal College of Defence Studies